Johannes Gerhardus Maria "John" Pierik (9 August 1949 – 14 January 2018) was a Dutch shooter. He competed in the mixed skeet event at the 1980 and 1984 Olympics and finished in eleventh and fourth place, respectively.

References

1949 births
2018 deaths
Dutch male sport shooters
Olympic shooters of the Netherlands
Shooters at the 1980 Summer Olympics
Shooters at the 1984 Summer Olympics
Sportspeople from Hengelo
20th-century Dutch people